Prince Hyodeok was a Goryeo Royal family member as the first son of Wang Uk and a grandson of Wang Geon, its founder. He was the oldest brother of King Seongjong, Queen Heonae, and Queen Heonjeong. Since their parents were died when he was young, he was raised by his paternal grandmother, Queen Sinjeong alongside his siblings. Therefore, it was speculated that he lived in Hwangju where Queen Sinjeong came from. Also, since King Gyeongjong's throne was succeeded by his younger brother and not him, so it might be that he died at a young age before the time of throne's ascension.

References

Korean princes
Year of birth unknown
Year of death unknown
10th-century Korean people